is a passenger railway station located in the city of Koshigaya, Saitama, Japan, operated by the private railway operator Tōbu Railway.

Lines
The station is served by the Tōbu Skytree Line (Tōbu Isesaki Line), and is 24.4 kilometers from the terminus of the line at Asakusa Station in Tokyo. Through services also operate to and from  via the Tokyo Metro Hibiya Line and  via the Tokyo Metro Hanzomon Line.

Station layout
The station has two elevated island platforms with two tracks each, one for all-stations "Local" services and one for express/rapid services. The station building is located underneath the platforms. There are two additional tracks for non-stopping trains to pass this station.

Platforms

Platforms 2 and 3 are used by all-stations "Local" services".

Adjacent stations

History

Koshigaya Station opened on 17 April 1920, with the name originally written as "". The kanji characters for the station name were changed to "" (with the pronunciation unchanged) on 1 December 1956. The station was rebuilt with elevated platforms in 1997.

From 17 March 2012, station numbering was introduced on all Tōbu lines, with Koshigaya Station becoming "TS-21".

Passenger statistics
In fiscal 2019, the station was used by an average of 50,714 passengers daily.

Surrounding area

 Koshigaya City Office
 Koshigaya City Library
 Koshigaya Municipal Hospital

Schools
 Saitama Prefectural Koshigaya High School
 Saitama Prefectural Koshigaya Higashi High School
 Koshigaya Sogo Gijutsu High School
 Koshigaya Elementary School

See also
 List of railway stations in Japan

References

External links

 Station information 

Railway stations in Japan opened in 1920
Tobu Skytree Line
Stations of Tobu Railway
Railway stations in Saitama Prefecture
Koshigaya, Saitama